Denis Alijagić (born 10 April 2003) is a Czech professional footballer who plays as a forward for Slovenian PrvaLiga side Maribor. Born in the Czech Republic, he has represented both the Czech Republic and Bosnia and Herzegovina internationally at youth level.

Club career
Born in Prague, Alijagić began his career with hometown Sparta Prague at the age of six. Between the ages of eight and ten, he played for Český Lev - Union Beroun, before returning to Sparta. In 2014, he moved to their city rivals Slavia Prague.

In 2021, Alijagić was loaned to Czech National Football League side Vlašim, where he made his senior debut. In the first half of the 2021–22 season, Alijagić scored 11 league goals and four Czech Cup goals, becoming Vlašim's top scorer. On 2 February 2022, he was loaned to Czech First League club Slovan Liberec, where he made five league appearances and failed to score in the process.

On 21 June 2022, Alijagić signed for Greek club Olympiacos. However, he was not part of the main squad and played for their B team in the second tier Super League Greece 2, where he made two appearances. In February 2023, he terminated his contract with Olympiacos and joined Slovenian PrvaLiga side Maribor, signing until the end of the 2022–23 season with the option of an extension.

International career
Alijagić was eligible to represent the Czech Republic through his birth place, and Bosnia and Herzegovina through his Bosnian father.

In November 2017, Alijagić made his debut for the Czech Republic's under-15 side, making four appearances at the 2017 South American U-15 Championship.

Alijagić then represented Bosnia and Herzegovina at youth level, before switching his national team allegiance back to the Czech Republic at under-19 level in November 2021.

Style of play
Alijagić's manager at Vlašim, Martin Hyský, has praised Alijagić's work rate, speed and his ability to use both feet. Alijagić has compared his own playing style to that of Jamie Vardy.

Career statistics

Club

References

External links
Denis Alijagić at Sofascore

2003 births
Living people
Footballers from Prague
Czech people of Bosnia and Herzegovina descent
Czech footballers
Association football forwards
SK Slavia Prague players
FC Sellier & Bellot Vlašim players
FC Slovan Liberec players
Olympiacos F.C. players
Olympiacos F.C. B players
NK Maribor players
Czech National Football League players
Czech First League players
Super League Greece 2 players
Slovenian PrvaLiga players
Czech Republic youth international footballers
Czech Republic under-21 international footballers
Bosnia and Herzegovina youth international footballers
Czech expatriate footballers
Czech expatriate sportspeople in Greece
Expatriate footballers in Greece
Czech expatriate sportspeople in Slovenia
Expatriate footballers in Slovenia